Patio Olmos is an architecturally significant shopping gallery in Córdoba, Argentina, and the city's most important.

History and overview
The development of a suburb southeast of Córdoba proper by developer Miguel Crisol was accompanied by a flurry of public investment. Among the first of such works was the Boys' Middle School, commissioned by Governor José Vicente de Olmos in 1906 and built by the Ministry of Public Works of the Province of Córdoba. Designed by Elías Senestrari, the renaissance revivalist building was inaugurated on November 4, 1909. Governor Olmos, who had recently died, was honored by having the school named after him.

Set on the northeast corner of the intersection of three major avenues, the semi-circular school was designed to maximize classroom area, and its original capacity of 500 students was later expanded to 800. The building's condition declined over the decades, however, and a 1977 earthquake in San Juan, Argentina, though over 300 mi (480 km) to the west, caused it serious structural damage and led to its closure. It remained abandoned until a 1991 initiative by Governor Eduardo Angeloz resulted in the building's restoration. The agreement signed in 1992 between the Province of Córdoba, the building's proprietors and a consortium of two local developers allowed the firms a 35-year lease at a token monthly rent in exchange for their development of the former school into an upscale shopping gallery and other investments. The resulting Patio Olmos Shopping Center was inaugurated in May 1995.

Mounting controversy surrounding the non-payment of taxes, delays on the promised construction of an annex for the adjoining Libertador Theatre (Córdoba's premier opera house), and the consortium's connections to the board of directors at the failed Banco Mayo S.A. led to political fallout, however, and the Province sold Patio Olmos in 2006 to IRSA, the nation's leading real estate development firm. The quick sale allowed Córdoba to rescind its contentious lease contract, though the building's sale price of US$32.5 million was reportedly well below market value.

Patio Olmos remains Córdoba's most important shopping mall, with brands like Lacoste, Puma, La Martina, Carmen Steffens, Levi's, 47 Street, Adidas, Swarovski, among others. Its 25,000 m² (265,000 ft²) indoor area houses over 150 retail outlets and a multiplex cinema operated by the Sydney-based Hoyts Group.

References

External links
 Patio Olmos 

Shopping malls in Argentina
Buildings and structures in Córdoba, Argentina
Buildings and structures completed in 1909
Shopping malls established in 1995
Tourist attractions in Córdoba Province, Argentina
1909 establishments in Argentina